The United States Air Force's 4th Space Launch Squadron was a space launch unit located at Vandenberg Air Force Base, California.  It was active at Vandenberg from 1994 to 1998 and again from 2003 to 2019.  It launched various satellites into orbit from the complex of launch pads at Vandenberg.

Mission
The 4th Space Launch Squadron was the Air Force's Evolved Expendable Launch Vehicle (EELV) launch agency for the West Coast.  The EELV system is a liquid-fueled first stage Common Booster Core (CBC) that can be used alone, with strap-on solid fuel rocket boosters, or as a configuration of three CBCs acting as a more powerful booster.

History
The squadron was activated at Vandenberg Air Force Base, California on 15 April 1994.  Until it was inactivated in June 1998, it launched surveillance and meteorological satellites into polar orbit.

After reactivation in 2003, the squadron managed operations for EELVs.  The EELV program was intended to develop provide alternatives to older and expensive heavy-lift launch vehicles, such as the Titan IV. EELVs include:
 The Boeing Delta IV.  There are different configurations for the Delta IV, which can lift payloads from 9,000 lb to over 13,000 lb into Geosynchronous Orbit. 
 The Lockheed Martin Atlas V.  This system also has different available configurations, and can lift payloads between 10,000 lb and 30,000 lb to Geosynchronous Transfer Orbit. 
 The Delta II, a heritage vehicle smaller than the newer Delta IV. The Delta II can have up to nine external rockets strapped to its main stage, increasing lift capability. It can send approximately 4,000 lb into Geosynchronous Transfer Orbit.

Lineage
 Constituted as the 4th Space Launch Squadron on 29 March 1994
 Activated on 15 April 1994
 Inactivated on 29 June 1998
 Activated on 1 December 2003
 Inactivated on 31 May 2019 (in merger with 1st Air and Space Test Squadron as 2nd Space Launch Squadron)

Assignments
 30th Operations Group, 15 April 1994 – 29 June 1998
 30th Launch Group, 1 Dec 2003 – 20 July 2018
 30th Operations Group, 20 July 2018 – 31 May 2019

Stations
 Vandenberg Air Force Base, California, 15 April 1994 – 29 June 1998
 Vandenberg Air Force Base, California, 1 December 2003 – 31 May 2019

Decorations

Launch Vehicles
 Titan II (1997–1998)
 Titan IV (1995–1997)
 Delta IV (2003–2019)
 Atlas V (2003–2019)

References

Notes

Bibliography

Military units and formations in California
Space Launch 0004